Osborn may refer to:

 Osborn (surname)
 Osborn Engineering, American architectural and engineering firm
 Osborn Engineering Company, British motorcycle manufacturer
 Osborn wave, an abnormal electrocardiogram finding

Places in the United States
 Osborn, Maine
 Osborn, Missouri
 Osborn, Montana
 Osborn, Ohio
 Osborn, Wisconsin
 Osborn Correctional Institution, Somers, Connecticut

See also
 Osborne (disambiguation)
 Osbourne (disambiguation)